Chocolove is a chocolate manufacturer with headquarters and a manufacturing facility in Boulder, Colorado, founded in 1995 by entrepreneur Timothy Moley.  The company produces all-natural and organic chocolate bars. 
Chocolove imports chocolate and cocoa butter from Belgium to produce its chocolate.

References

External links
Official website

American chocolate companies
Manufacturing companies based in Boulder, Colorado
Food and drink companies established in 1996
Organic chocolate